Bagumbanua is an island located in the Philippine island Province of Masbate. In 1919 it was reported to have mangrove trees.

See also

 List of islands of the Philippines

References

Islands of Masbate